The Miss Trinidad & Tobago Pageant is a beauty pageant that has been held annually since 1954. The contest is meant to select a suitable delegate from the twin island republic, to compete in the Miss World pageant. The nation has one Miss World, Miss World 1986, Giselle Laronde.

History
Miss Trinidad & Tobago registered trademark started in 1954 exclusively for Miss World.  The first Miss Trinidad and Tobago contest started in 1954 where the eventual winner, Seeta Indranie Mahabir represented the British Commonwealth country at the fourth edition of the contest. Trinidad and Tobago have never withdrawn from the Miss World contest since the 70's. It is the only international contest (Miss World) that they have been consistent in sending a representative to. The Miss World brand is the most established pageant brand in the country. According to Google trends, T&T is ranked 4th as per most searches for Miss World. The British High Commissioner in Trinidad and Tobago (1950's to 1970's) were responsible for sending Miss Trinidad and Tobago winner to Miss World. Then in 1979, they gave the rights to local socialite and businesswoman, Kim Sabeeny. Kim Sabeeny died in 1999. Peter Elias then took over the franchise with Trinidad and Tobago first Miss World, Giselle Laronde. Peter Elias resigned after Gabrielle Walcott placed 2nd runner-up at the 58th edition of the Miss World contest. He gave the directorship to Micheal Raghunanan and Daniel Seebaran in 2009. In 2013, Athaliah Samuel held the franchise and there was a dispute between the franchise holder and the then-titleholder, Shereece Villafana, who was then stripped of her title by the national franchise holder after competing in Miss World. In 2014, Vanessa Manoo and Nicaraguan Businessman, Gregory Lewin took over the company for the next three years. The current directors of Miss T&T Company are Charu Lochan Dass under the tutelage of Brian Gopaul and Dr. Reiaz Mohammed (Vice National Director) who took over the organisation for Miss Trinidad and Tobago in 2018.

Description
Miss Trinidad and Tobago's mission are to inspire and empower the young women of Trinidad and Tobago to become the best version of themselves.

Official broadcaster
 TTT, 1962 - 2004
 Television 4 (TV4),  2005
 CTV, 2006 – 2012
 CNC3, 2013 – present

Team Members

The Miss World Trinidad and Tobago Board of Directors for 2018 are: 
 Brian Gopaul - National Franchise Holder  
 Charu Lochan Dass - National Director 
 Dr. Reiaz Mohammed - Co National Pageant Director
 Sheree Ann Ramsingh - Chief Operating Officer
 Jevon King - Dep. Chief Operating Officer
 Peter Sheppard - Art, History, & Culture Director
 Richard Ahong - Producer
 Vaughnette Bigford - Fashion & Entertainment Director
 Kavita Maharaj (Genie) - Photography / Social Media Manager
 Kiran Maharaj - Digital Media Manager

Titleholders
Miss Trinidad and Tobago national pageant is a contest meant to select a representative for Miss World. 

Color key

Miss International

Miss Asia Pacific

Best Model of the Universe

References

External links

Beauty pageants in Trinidad and Tobago
Trinidad and Tobago
Recurring events established in 1966
Trinidad and Tobago awards